
Rabbit Run may refer to:

 A rabbit warren or rabbit hutch

Media
Rabbit, Run, a 1960 novel by John Updike
Rabbit, Run (film), a 1970 American independent film based on the Updike novel
"Run Rabbit Run", a 1939 song by Noel Gay and Ralph Butler
"Rabbit Run", a song by Eminem from 8 Mile: Music from and Inspired by the Motion Picture

Rivers

Indiana
Rabbit Run (Doe Creek), a tributary of Doe Creek in Putnam County

Montana
Rabbit Run (Marten Creek), at tributary of Marten Creek in Sanders County

Nebraska
Rabbit Run Creek (Little Blue River), a tributary of the Little Blue River in Adams County

Ohio
Rabbit Run (Turkey Creek), a tributary of Turkey Creek in Scioto County

Pennsylvania
Rabbit Run (Delaware River), a tributary of the Delaware River in Bucks County